Major Ritchie defeated Herbert Roper Barrett 6–2, 6–3, 4–6, 6–4 in the All Comers' Final, but the reigning champion Arthur Gore defeated Ritchie 6–8, 1–6, 6–2, 6–2, 6–2 in the challenge round to win the gentlemen's singles tennis title at the 1909 Wimbledon Championships. Arthur Gore was the oldest winner of the title at 41 years and 182 days.

Draw

Challenge round

All comers' finals

Top half

Section 1

Section 2

Section 3

Section 4

Bottom half

Section 5

Section 6

Section 7

Section 8

References

External links

Men's Singles
Wimbledon Championship by year – Men's singles